Kerala is a genus of moths of the family Nolidae erected by Frederic Moore in 1881.

Species
 Kerala decipiens (Butler, 1879)
 Kerala grisea (Hampson, 1912)
 Kerala houlberti Oberthür, 1921
 Kerala lentiginosa Wileman, 1914
 Kerala multipunctata Moore, 1882
 Kerala punctilineata Moore, 1881

References

Nolidae